"This Could Be Heaven" is a song Seal recorded in the year 2000 for his fourth album Togetherland.

Background
The album was scrapped after it was rejected by his record company as they believed the album would not be commercially successful. "This Could Be Heaven" is the only song from the album that was officially released as it was included on the soundtrack for the film The Family Man. The song was released as a single in support of the soundtrack in 2001.

There are two versions, with five different edits of the final version circulating. The first version is an early recording that runs for 3:30, with a more simple arrangement and different chords. Thirty seconds of this early version circulated, along with thirty-second snippets of all songs on the album, as a 'Togetherland' preview, when the album was still due to be released. The second is an edit of the final version, it's subtitled "FM edit" and runs for 4:29. Both these were not officially released, only being streamed, along with 'Togetherland' tracks "Elise", "All That I Wanted to Say" and "Love is Better", on the song's co-author, orchestra arranger and producer Henry Jackman's website and circulate among fans. His website, henryjackman.net, is currently unavailable.

As for the released versions, the one on 'Family Man: Music from the Motion Picture' album and runs for 4:46.

The lengths of the tracks on the CD single are listed below, with the Radio Edit and the so-called Acoustic Version being very similar mixes, with only a few differences in the backing vocals. The track listed as "LP Version" on the CD single is 20 seconds longer than the one on the soundtrack album.

Track listing
"This Could Be Heaven" (Radio Edit) – 4:04
"This Could Be Heaven" (LP Version) – 5:06
"This Could Be Heaven" (Family Man Soundtrack Version) – 4:43
"This Could Be Heaven" (Acoustic Version) – 4:02

Charts

Peak positions

References

2001 singles
Seal (musician) songs
2000 songs
Songs written by Seal (musician)